Jarno Westerman (born 8 June 2002) is a Dutch football player. He plays for PEC Zwolle.

Club career
He made his Eredivisie debut for PEC Zwolle on 2 August 2019 in a game against Willem II. He made his first start on 25 August 2019 against Sparta Rotterdam.

References

External links
 

2002 births
Footballers from Overijssel
Living people
Dutch footballers
Association football forwards
PEC Zwolle players
Eredivisie players
People from Hardenberg